Litoribacillus peritrichatus is a Gram-negative, strictly aerobic, short rod-shaped and motile bacterium from the genus of Litoribacillus with peritrichous flagella which has been isolated from coastal sediments from the Yellow Sea near Qingdao in China.

References

Oceanospirillales
Bacteria described in 2014